Thomas Joseph Smith (September 27, 1886 – August 1, 1966) was a Canadian professional ice hockey forward, who played from 1905 until 1920 for 16 teams in his career. He was a member of two Stanley Cup-winning teams, the Ottawa Silver Seven of 1906 and the Quebec Bulldogs of 1913. His two older brothers Alf and Harry Smith also played professional ice hockey.

Playing career
Smith was born in Ottawa, Ontario, to Mr. and Mrs. Henry Smith, one of seven brothers who would play senior ice hockey. Smith began playing senior hockey as an amateur with the Ottawa Emmetts from 1903 until 1905. He joined the Ottawa Victorias of the Federal Amateur Hockey League (FAHL) in 1905-06, and also played for the Stanley Cup champion Ottawa Hockey Club, aka the "Silver Seven" that same year, playing with his older brothers Alf and Harry.

He moved to Pittsburgh to become a professional with the Pittsburgh Professionals in 1906, playing three seasons with the team before returning to Canada to join the Brantford Indians of the Ontario Professional Hockey League (OPHL). Smith played two seasons with Brantford, but missed much of the 1909–10 season with typhoid fever. In 1910-11 he became a member of the Galt Professionals of the OPHL helping Galt win the OPHL championship. Along with most of the Galt team, he bolted to the Moncton Victorias the following season, helping Moncton win the Maritime championship. The Galt and Moncton teams Smith was a member of played consecutive Stanley Cup challenges, Galt against Ottawa in 1911 and Moncton against Quebec in 1912, both times unsuccessfully.

Smith joined the Quebec Bulldogs for the 1912–13 season, where he won the Stanley Cup at the end of the season. After the 1913–14 season in Quebec, he was traded (twice) to Toronto Shamrocks. This caused a dispute with the Pacific Coast Hockey Association. At that time, the NHA and PCHA had an agreement whereby the PCHA teams could draft one player from three of the six teams of the NHA. He was traded away from Quebec, which was eligible to lose a player. He started play for Shamrocks, though he had been drafted by Victoria of the PCHA. It was found that the initial trade was not allowed, and Quebec re-traded him to Toronto during the season, disregarding the PCHA efforts to get him. During the 1914–15 season, he was traded back to Quebec, avoiding the PCHA draft again.

Much like his older brother Harry, Tommy Smith was a mercenary when it came to club loyalty, playing for a number of different teams both in Canada and in the United States. In December 1914, when he still had not reached terms with the Toronto Ontarios/Shamrocks franchise, he claimed the location where he played was secondary to the financial aspect of the game:

"There is a big margin between us, I'll play here or in Mexico if the money is strong enough. I don't care where I play. This story about my not wanting to play anywhere else but Ottawa is not correct."

While skating for the Ottawa Victorias in 1906, Smith led the FAHL with 12 goals (including eight goals in a game against Brockville on February 23, 1906). In future years, he was the leading goal-scorer in the OPHL (1908–09), the MPHA (1910–11) and the NHA (1913–14, 1914–15).

Career statistics

Regular season and playoffs

* Stanley Cup Champion.

Awards and achievements
 1906 – Member of Stanley Cup champion Ottawa Silver Seven
 1913 – Stanley Cup Champion with the Quebec Bulldogs
 1973 – Inducted into the Hockey Hall of Fame

References

Notes

External links
 

1886 births
1966 deaths
Canadian ice hockey centres
Hockey Hall of Fame inductees
Ice hockey people from Ottawa
Montreal Canadiens (NHA) players
Ottawa Senators (original) players
Pittsburgh Bankers players
Pittsburgh Lyceum (ice hockey) players
Pittsburgh Professionals players
Quebec Bulldogs (NHA) players
Quebec Bulldogs players
Stanley Cup champions
Toronto Shamrocks players
Burials at Notre-Dame Cemetery (Ottawa)